Bassina yatei is a bivalve mollusc of the family Veneridae.

References
 Powell A W B, William Collins Publishers Ltd, Auckland 1979 

Veneridae
Bivalves of New Zealand
Bivalves described in 1835
Taxa named by John Edward Gray